The Spirit of the American Doughboy is a pressed copper sculpture by E. M. Viquesney, designed to honor the veterans and casualties of World War I. Mass-produced during the 1920s and 1930s for communities throughout the United States, the statue's design was the most popular of its kind, spawning a wave of collectible miniatures and related memorabilia as well as numerous copies by other artists. Its title is often shortened to The Doughboy.

Memorials
The statue depicts a doughboy walking through shattered tree stumps strung with barbed wire, his rifle in his left hand and his right hand held high above his head, clutching a hand grenade. The aggressive design and affordability of the statue made it extremely popular, and more than 150 copies of it were created for municipal memorials across the nation. The Smithsonian American Art Museum currently lists 159 locations. Of that number, 134 currently existing originals have been independently authenticated, and several have been identified as copies by other artists (notably Over the Top by John Paulding). Viquesney's actual brochures quoted a figure of over 300 by the late 1930s, claiming at least one in every state of the Union, but this is believed to be an inflated figure.

Two of the statues, both in Arkansas, are individually listed on the National Register of Historic Places; one in Helena and one in Fort Smith. Installed in cemeteries, town squares, and parks, outside museums, on courthouse lawns, and countless other places, the design is said to be the most-viewed example of outdoor statuary in the U.S. (after the Statue of Liberty) although many people do not even realize they have seen it.

In 1998, longtime Sarasota-resident sculptor Frank Colson was commissioned to create a copy for the city of Sarasota, Florida, and again in 2002, for the city of Columbia, South Carolina. These were new copies in their own right, not meant to replace any existing Doughboys as Sarasota never had an original Viquesney Doughboy. An original does exist in another part of Columbia, SC, giving that city two; an original and a copy. Colson and his son also worked on the restoration of the Doughboy in Clearwater, Florida, along with its companion statue, Spirit of the American Navy.

The original Doughboy statue was completed in 1921 while Viquesney was living in Americus, Georgia and is located in Nashville, Georgia. However, it was the second to be installed, and about the 25th to be formally dedicated. The original Nashville, Ga. statue has a late dedication date for two reasons. First, it was sent all across The United States by train for promotional reasons – so prospective buyers could see first hand what they were purchasing. Secondly, the Nashville, Berrien County authorities did not want to display it until the tall base they had purchased for its display had been fully paid off. The first completed installation was at Furman University in Greenville, South Carolina. The statue in Spencer, Indiana, the sculptor's hometown, was not dedicated until May 29, 1927.

Statuettes
The statue also sparked an interior decorating fad in the 1920s. The design was so popular that Viquesney manufactured replica pot metal statuettes by the thousands. Also available were Doughboy lamps, which were made from the 12" statuettes (the Doughboy held a light bulb and lampshade in his raised hand), candlesticks, plaques, a smaller 6" version of the statuette, as well as less expensive plaster versions. The statuettes and lamps were made from 1921 to 1925 in Americus, Georgia, and continued to be produced in Spencer, Indiana until at least the late 1930s. With the passage of time and changes in fashion, many of these items were lost, broken, or discarded, making those few remaining in good condition sought after by modern collectors.

Variations on the theme

Another statue, created as a companion to the Doughboy, was entitled Spirit of the American Navy. This version depicted a sailor in a working uniform holding his cover aloft in his right hand. Far less popular than the Doughboy, only seven were made. All the known Navy statues are installed as part of a set along with a Doughboy statue, or occur nearby, as one of each at the ends of a bridge.  Another version, holding a large artillery shell with both hands instead of waving his cap, appears in a 1926 Friedley-Voshardt catalog. The only stone version of the Spirit of the American Navy is found in Crowell, Texas according to a November 2, 2011 article by Daniel Walker in The Vernon Daily Record.

The Smithsonian lists only six under the correct title (the seventh being listed along with the Doughboy at Kingman, Arizona). One, located in Palatka, Florida, is actually a different version of the statue said to have been created by sculptor Ray Fernandez, although no reference to any sculptor by that name exists in either the Smithsonian Art Inventories Catalogue or the AskART.com database. Viquesney's 1936 list shows "2 Doughboys, 2 Sailors", reinforcing the likelihood that Viquesney's "2+2" brochure claim was a typo, since all four statues (the two "standard" Doughboys, the Sailor, and a variant design Doughboy), were all dedicated at Palatka on November 11, 1927, according to newspaper articles.  A Smithsonian reference to the Palatka variant Doughboy states that it may possibly have been sculpted by Gutzon Borglum.  There is no proof of this, although Viquesney's self-written obituary boasts that "he knew Borglum".

Other variants were designed by Viquesney to depict different doughboy poses, but very few got past the drawing stage and none were ever realized at full scale. The largest variant actually known to be by Viquesney is a unique three-foot memorial in Lakemore, Ohio, also listed as The Spirit of the Doughboy by the Smithsonian. It was copyrighted in 1930 and dedicated in 1938. No full-sized Viquesney doughboys in any pose other than the original have been confirmed to exist. New information and photographs confirm this piece is actually titled Resting Doughboy and was copyrighted in 1936.

See also
American Doughboy Bringing Home Victory (1932) by Alonzo Victor Lewis
The Doughboy (1924) by Humberto Pendretti

References

External links

1921 sculptures
Copper sculptures in the United States
Military monuments and memorials in the United States
Outdoor sculptures in Arkansas
Outdoor sculptures in Florida
Outdoor sculptures in Georgia (U.S. state)
Outdoor sculptures in Indiana
Outdoor sculptures in South Carolina
Sculptures of men in the United States
World War I memorials in the United States